Graham Robert Oppy (born 1960) is an Australian philosopher whose main area of research is the philosophy of religion. He currently holds the posts of Professor of Philosophy and Associate Dean of Research at Monash University and serves as CEO of the Australasian Association of Philosophy, Chief Editor of the Australasian Philosophical Review, Associate Editor of the Australasian Journal of Philosophy, and serves on the editorial boards of Philo, Philosopher's Compass, Religious Studies, and Sophia. He was elected Fellow of the Australian Academy of the Humanities in 2009.

Biography
Graham Oppy was born in Benalla on 6 October 1960 to a Methodist family, but he ceased to be a religious believer as a young teenager, and is now an atheist. His family moved to Ballarat in 1965 and had his secondary schooling at Wesley College, Melbourne. He attended Melbourne University from 1979, where he completed two degrees: a BA (Hons) in philosophy and a BSc in mathematics. In 1987 he started graduate work at Princeton University under the supervision of Gilbert Harman on questions in the philosophy of language.

He was a lecturer at the University of Wollongong from 1990 to 1992 and after doing a post-doc at the Australian National University, he moved to Monash as a senior lecturer, and was promoted to professor in 2005. He is currently Associate Dean of Research (since 2004) and Associate Dean of Graduate Studies in the Faculty of Arts at Monash University.

Books
 Ontological Arguments and Belief in God, 1996. .
 Philosophical Perspectives on Infinity, 2006. .
 Arguing About Gods, 2006. .
 "Evolution vs Creationism in Australian Schools", chapter in The Australian Book of Atheism, 2010. .
 The Best Argument against God, 2013. 
 Reinventing Philosophy of Religion: An Opinionated Introduction, 2014. 
 Describing Gods: An Investigation of Divine Attributes, 2014. 
 The Routledge Handbook of Contemporary Philosophy of Religion (Routledge Handbooks in Philosophy), 2017. 
 Atheism and Agnosticism (Elements in the Philosophy of Religion), 2018. 
 Atheism: The Basics, 2018. 
 Naturalism and Religion: A Contemporary Philosophical Investigation (Investigating Philosophy of Religion), 2018. 
 (with Joseph Koterski) Theism and Atheism: Opposing Arguments In Philosophy, 2018. 
 A Companion to Atheism and Philosophy (Blackwell Companions to Philosophy), 2019. 
 Is There a God?: A Debate (Little Debates about Big Questions), 2021.

Notes and references

External links
 Personal Homepage at Monash University - Includes career summary and highlights and a link to a complete list of publications.
 Graham Oppy articles at Internet Infidels
 Ontological arguments and The Turing Test at the Stanford Encyclopedia of Philosophy.
 Interview on contemporary atheism
Graham Oppy on the Kalam Cosmological Argument by William Lane Craig

1960 births
20th-century atheists
20th-century Australian male writers
20th-century Australian philosophers
20th-century educational theorists
20th-century educators
20th-century essayists
21st-century atheists
21st-century Australian male writers
21st-century Australian philosophers
21st-century educational theorists
21st-century educators
21st-century essayists
Analytic philosophers
Atheism activists
Atheist philosophers
Australian atheists
Australian educational theorists
Australian educators
Australian essayists
Australian male non-fiction writers
Academic staff of the Australian National University
Australian social commentators
Critics of creationism
Critics of religions
Epistemologists
Former Methodists
Historians of philosophy
Australian historians of religion
Lecturers
Literacy and society theorists
Living people
Metaphysics writers
Academic staff of Monash University
Ontologists
People educated at Wesley College (Victoria)
People from Benalla
Philosophers of education
Philosophers of history
Philosophers of language
Philosophers of religion
Philosophers of science
Princeton University alumni
Social philosophers
University of Melbourne alumni
Academic staff of the University of Wollongong
Writers about religion and science